Alisa Kezheradze (11 December 1937, Tbilisi, Republic of Georgia – 18 February 1996, London, UK) was a Georgian pianist and teacher.  She received her first piano lessons from her pianist mother Lucya Kezheradze. She studied at the Tbilisi Central Music School for Gifted Children with Nina Pleshcheyeva, a student of Alexander Siloti, and subsequently, at the Tbilisi State Conservatoire with Emil Gurevich.

In early 1970s, she married a construction engineer George Teslenko, with whom she had a son George, and moved to Moscow, where she taught piano at the State Pedagogical University.

In 1976, she met and began working with Ivo Pogorelić, whom she  married in 1980.

She died on February 18, 1996, from liver cancer.

References

Classical pianists from Georgia (country)
Women pianists from Georgia (country)
Women classical pianists
1937 births
1996 deaths
20th-century classical pianists
20th-century women pianists
Soviet classical pianists